Zhongguan is a town of Longhua County in northeastern Hebei province, China, about  due north of Chengde city proper. , it has 10 villages under its administration.

See also 
 List of township-level divisions of Hebei

References 

Township-level divisions of Hebei
Longhua County